Mahamat Djarma Khatir, Chad politician born in 1943, was mayor of Fort-Lamy (1972–1975) and former member of National Liberation Front of Chad (FROLINAT). Involved in politics during the democratic process, he founded later a Sufi-based religious movement called Faydah al Djariyya. He currently lives in exile after joining rebels fighting against Idriss Déby Itno.

References 

Chadian politicians
1943 births
Living people
Mayors of places in Chad
People from N'Djamena